Kalpana Devi Thoudam (born 24 December 1989) is an Indian judoka, born in Imphal East, Manipur. She won the bronze medal in the women's 52 kg weight class at the 2014 Commonwealth Games in Glasgow, Scotland.

Career
In her career as a judoka, Thoudam won a silver at the sub-junior national championship in Guwahati in 1998. She then won four gold medals at the junior national championships and one gold at junior Asian judo championship. In 2007, she placed second at the Asian U20 Championships, held in Hyderabad. In 2010, she won a bronze at the International Judo Federation World Cup in Tashkent. In the same year, she won a gold medal at the Commonwealth Judo Championships in Singapore. In 2013, she became the first Indian to win a medal at the IJF Grand Prix in Tashkent, Uzbekistan, when she won a bronze medal. She defeated Zarifa Sultanova of Uzbekistan, but lost to Israeli Gili Cohen. In the repechage round she defeated Raquel Silva from Brazil. Additionally, she has served as the Head Constable of the Indo-Tibetan Border Police.

In the 2014 Commonwealth Games, she won bronze in the 52 kg weight class. She has also won gold medals at the Indian Championships in 2017 and 2018, held in Chennai and Jammu, respectively.

References

External links

 
 

Living people
Indian female judoka
1989 births
People from Imphal East district
Judoka at the 2010 Asian Games
Judoka at the 2014 Asian Games
Judoka at the 2018 Asian Games
Commonwealth Games bronze medallists for India
Sportswomen from Manipur
Judoka at the 2014 Commonwealth Games
Indian female martial artists
Commonwealth Games medallists in judo
21st-century Indian women
21st-century Indian people
Martial artists from Manipur
Asian Games competitors for India
Medallists at the 2014 Commonwealth Games